is a railway station on the Iiyama Line in the city of Iiyama, Nagano Prefecture, Japan, operated by East Japan Railway Company (JR East).

Lines
Shinano-Taira Station is served by the Iiyama Line, and is 23.8 kilometers from the starting point of the line at Toyono Station.

Station layout
The station consists of one side platform serving one bi-directional track, with a converted former freight car as the station building. The station is unattended.

History
It was renamed Shinano-Taira Station with the nationalisation of the Iiyama line on 1 June 1944. With the privatization of Japanese National Railways (JNR) on 1 April 1987, the station came under the control of JR East.

Surrounding area
Chikuma River

See also
 List of railway stations in Japan

References

External links

  

Stations of East Japan Railway Company
Railway stations in Nagano Prefecture
Iiyama Line
Railway stations in Japan opened in 1923
Iiyama, Nagano